Jaime Ayala may refer to:

 Jaime Zobel de Ayala (born 1934), Filipino businessman
 Jaime Augusto Zobel de Ayala (born 1959), Filipino businessman
 Jaime Ayala (entrepreneur) (born 1962), Filipino social engineer
 Jaime Ayala (footballer) (born 1990), Mexican footballer